Buddies is an American television sitcom that aired on ABC from March 5 to May 29, 1996. It was created by Carmen Finestra, David McFadzean, and Matt Williams and starred Dave Chappelle, Christopher Gartin, Tanya Wright, Jeff Rawluk and Richard Roundtree.

History

Home Improvement connection
Comedians Dave Chappelle and Jim Breuer attracted the attention of TV network executives with their guest appearance on the (4th season) March 14, 1995 episode of ABC's highly rated sitcom Home Improvement. The storyline had Chappelle and Breuer play friends who appear together on Tool Time to ask Tim Taylor advice on their girlfriends. The characters' single outing on the episode proved so popular that ABC decided to give Chappelle and Breuer their own half-hour sitcom.

Cast changes
After subsequent rehearsals, Jim Breuer was replaced with Christopher Gartin as Dave Chappelle's "buddy". The unique comic timing and chemistry that Chappelle had with Breuer, his real-life friend, was not present with Gartin, and Breuer's abrupt firing exacerbated ill will. This prevented Chappelle and Gartin from developing the rapport and chemistry necessary for the characters' believability and likeability.

Broadcast
Buddies premiered on Tuesday, March 5, 1996. The show garnered disappointing ratings. Buddies was cancelled on April 3 after airing only five out of the 13 produced episodes. Dave Chappelle himself was not proud of his involvement with Buddies in retrospect:

Cast
David Chappelle as Dave Carlisle
Christopher Gartin as John Bailey
Tanya Wright as Phyllis Brooks
Paula Cale as Lorraine Bailey
Judith Ivey as Maureen DeMoss
Richard Roundtree as Henry Carlisle

Episode list

Home media 
Best Buy released an exclusive DVD on May 15, 2005 that contained 10 episodes of Buddies, including all 8 unaired episodes.

References

External links
 

1990s American black sitcoms
1990s American sitcoms
1990s American comedy television series
1996 American television series debuts
1996 American television series endings
American Broadcasting Company original programming
American television spin-offs
English-language television shows
Television series by ABC Studios
Television shows set in Chicago
Home Improvement (TV series)
Latino sitcoms